The chamail  is a type of poncho-like clothing from Central Asia.

As a result of Central-Asian influence, this type of clothing also appears in Indian works of art of the 1st millennium CE, as in Ajanta or Bagh. The chamail was probably introduced in India by the Sakas or the Kushans. The chamail also appears in Gandharan Buddhist sites such as Fondukistan and Bamiyan, and even as far as Xinjiang. In Kashmir also, the chamail appears on the Buddha or Bodhisattavas during the 6-7th century CE.

Examples

References

Sources
 

Dresses